Zaitzevia is a genus of riffle beetles in the family Elmidae. There are about 19 described species in Zaitzevia. The genus is named after the Russian entomologist Filipp Zaitsev (ru).

Taxonomy 
The genus Zaitzevia was originally described in 1923 by George Charles Champion, a British entomologist. Champion placed two species within the genus: Z. solidicornis, which he designated as the type species, and Z. acutangula. While Z. solidicornis remains the type species of the genus, Z. acutangula was later transferred to the genus Indosolus.

In 2001, American entomologist Harley Brown proposed dividing the genus into two subgenera in order to better represent the diversity of the genus. Subgenus Zaitzevia is represented by Z. solidicornis, while the new subgenus Suzevia is represented by Z. posthonia.

Species 
The following 21 species are recognized as belonging to the genus Zaitzevia:

Currently accepted 

 Zaitzevia aritai 
 Zaitzevia awana 
 Zaitzevia babai 
 Zaitzevia bhutanica 
 Zaitzevia chenzhitengi 
 Zaitzevia elongata 
 Zaitzevia formosana 
 Zaitzevia malaisei 
 Zaitzevia nitida 
 Zaitzevia parallela 
 Zaitzevia parallele 
 Zaitzevia parvula 
 Zaitzevia pocsi 
 Zaitzevia posthonia 
 Zaitzevia rivalis 
 Zaitzevia rufa 
 Zaitzevia solidicornis 
 Zaitzevia thermae 
 Zaitzevia tsushimana 
 Zaitzevia xiongzichuni 
 Zaitzevia yaeyamana

Transferred 

Zaitzevia acutangula – to Indosolus

References

Further reading

 
 
 
 

Elmidae
Articles created by Qbugbot